Gourley may refer to:

Places:
 Gourley Township, Michigan, USA

People:
 Brenda Gourley, fourth Vice-Chancellor of the Open University
 Cyril Edward Gourley (1893–1982), English recipient of the Victoria Cross
 Edward Temperley Gourley (1826–1902), English businessman and Member of Parliament for Sunderland
 Henry I. Gourley (1838–1899), Mayor of Pittsburgh, Pennsylvania, from 1890 to 1893
 John Baldwin Gourley, lead singer and frontman of the band Portugal. The Man.
 Matt Gourley, American actor, comedian, and podcaster.
 Noeline Gourley (1925–2022), New Zealand sportswoman
 Paul Gourley, former National Chairman of the College Republican National Committee in the United States
 Robin Gourley Irish-Australian rugby union and rugby league footballer
 Scott Gourley (born 1968), Australian rugby union and rugby league footballer